Wisconsin shooting may refer to several mass shootings in Wisconsin, United States:
 Crandon shooting, October 7, 2007
 Wisconsin Sikh temple shooting, August 5, 2012
 Azana Spa shooting, October 21, 2012
 2017 Marathon County shootings, March 22, 2017
 Milwaukee brewery shooting, February 26, 2020
 Mayfair Mall shooting, November 20, 2020